The 2021 Wiesbaden Tennis Open was a professional women's tennis tournament played on outdoor clay courts. It was the twelfth edition of the tournament which was part of the 2021 ITF Women's World Tennis Tour. It took place in Wiesbaden, Germany between 20 and 26 September 2021.

Singles main-draw entrants

Seeds

 1 Rankings are as of 13 September 2021.

Other entrants
The following players received wildcards into the singles main draw:
  Mina Hodzic
  Kathleen Kanev
  Anna Klasen
  Laura Isabel Putz

The following player received entry using a junior exempt:
  Victoria Jiménez Kasintseva

The following players received entry from the qualifying draw:
  Kamilla Bartone
  Nefisa Berberović
  Cristiana Ferrando
  Lina Gjorcheska
  Arianne Hartono
  Lena Papadakis
  Andreea Roșca
  Stephanie Wagner

The following player received entry as a lucky loser:
  Yana Morderger

Champions

Singles

  Anna Bondár def.  Clara Burel, 6–2, 6–4

Doubles

  Anna Bondár /  Lara Salden def.  Arianne Hartono /  Olivia Tjandramulia, 6–7(9–11), 6–2, [10–4]

References

External links
 2021 Wiesbaden Tennis Open at ITFtennis.com
 Official website

2021 ITF Women's World Tennis Tour
2021 in German tennis
September 2021 sports events in Germany